Hyslop is a surname originating in Scotland. It may refer to:

Christian Hyslop (born 1972), footballer
Fiona Hyslop (born 1964), Scottish politician
Helen Hyslop
Hector Hyslop (1840–1920), English cricketer
Geddes Hyslop (d. 1989), British architect
James Hyslop (poet) (1798–1827), Scottish poet
James A. Hyslop (1884–1953), American entomologist
James E. Hyslop (1862-1931), Scottish businessman
James H. Hyslop (1854–1920), American psychologist and psychic researcher
Jeff Hyslop (born 1951), Canadian actor
Joshua Hyslop, Canadian folk-pop singer-songwriter
Kenny Hyslop (born 1951), Scottish drummer
Kirk Hyslop (born 1889), Canadian architect
Ricky Hyslop (1915–1998), Canadian violinist, conductor, composer, and arranger
Robin Maxwell-Hyslop (1931–2010), British Conservative Party politician
T. B. Hyslop (1865-1933), British physician specialising in mental health
Tommy Hyslop (1874–1936), footballer

See also
Hislop
Heslop